A military invention is an invention that was first created by a military. There are many inventions that were originally created by the military and subsequently found civilian uses.

Military inventions with civilian uses

See also
 Allied technological cooperation during World War II
 List of emerging military technologies

References

Inventions
Inventions
Lists of inventions or discoveries
Technological races
Inventions
Inventions